Molly Reynolds is an Australian producer, screenwriter and director, best known for the 2021 documentary My Name is Gulpilil about acclaimed actor and dancer David Gulpilil. She wrote and directed Another Country in 2015, and co-wrote and co-directed the single-person ShoPaapaa in 2020.

Many of Reynolds' works are on the subject of Indigenous Australians' experience, which began as a "happy accident" as her partner Rolf de Heer began work on the 2006 film Ten Canoes.

Reynolds has also worked as a consultant in the Australian film sector, advising on national qualifications, developing and delivering curricula at a range of universities, and sitting on review panels.

Filmography

References

Australian directors
Australian screenwriters
Living people
Year of birth missing (living people)